Beautiful Dreamer: Brian Wilson and the Story of Smile is a 2004 documentary film directed by David Leaf about Brian Wilson, the Beach Boys' unfinished Smile album, and the making of Brian Wilson Presents Smile.

Overview
The documentary was shot between late 2003 and August 2004 and includes interviews with Wilson and dozens of his associates, albeit none of his surviving bandmates from the Beach Boys, who declined to appear in the film. It also includes contributions from Elvis Costello, Burt Bacharach, and Roger Daltrey. The title takes its name from the 19th century Stephen Foster song "Beautiful Dreamer"; its opening lyrics begin with the phrase "beautiful dreamer wake", the same initials as the documentary's subject, Brian Douglas Wilson, who references this coincidence in the film.

The film is divided in three segments: a history of the Beach Boys' original Smile album, its rebirth as Brian Wilson Presents Smile, and the album's 2004 live performances. It originally premiered on the network Showtime before being bundled as an extra on the DVD for the 2005 concert film Brian Wilson Presents Smile.

Cast

References

External links

Further reading
 

2004 films
2004 documentary films
American music history
Brian Wilson
Films about the Beach Boys
Rockumentaries
Documentary films about singers
2000s English-language films
2000s American films